Whistle for Willie is a 1964 children's picture book by American author and illustrator Ezra Jack Keats.

Plot
The protagonist, Peter, wants to be able to call his dog Willie by whistling. Although the whistling hurts him after a while he doesn't give up and eventually succeeds.

Reception
Whistle for Willie has been used to educate children.

Ann Marie Sammataro of Common Sense Media said that it 'celebrates a child's ingenuity'. Kirkus Reviews stated that 'the Caldecott prize winner has captured in words and eye-stopping pictures a big day in a small boy's life...'

Film
In 1964, Jan Harvey narrated and played the characters in the cartoon film.

References

1964 children's books
American picture books
Books by Ezra Jack Keats
Sequel books
Viking Press books